The 3rd Zee Cine Awards also The 3rd Lux Zee Cine Awards ceremony, presented by Zee Entertainment Enterprises, honored the best Indian Hindi-language films of 1999. The ceremony was held on 11 March 2000 at Andheri Sports Complex, Mumbai.

Hum Dil De Chuke Sanam led the ceremony with 25 nominations, followed by Hum Saath-Saath Hain with 12 nominations, and Sarfarosh and Taal with 11 nominations each.

Hum Dil De Chuke Sanam won 11 awards, including Best Film, Best Director (for Sanjay Leela Bhansali) and Best Actress (for Aishwarya Rai), thus becoming the most-awarded film at the ceremony.

Awards 

The winners and nominees have been listed below. Winners are listed first, highlighted in boldface, and indicated with a double dagger.

Popular Awards

Technical Awards

Special Awards

Superlatives

References

External links 
 The Zee Cine Awards (2000) at the Internet Movie Database

Zee Cine Awards
2000 Indian film awards